Gregory John Peart (born 18 March 1946) is a former Australian politician. He was born in Burnie, Tasmania and holds a Bachelor of Arts, a Bachelor of Education and a Diploma of Education. At the 1986 state election, he was elected to the Tasmanian House of Assembly as a Labor member for Braddon. He held the seat until his defeat in 1989.

References

1946 births
Living people
Members of the Tasmanian House of Assembly
Australian Labor Party members of the Parliament of Tasmania